Katie or Katy Sullivan may refer to:
Katie Sullivan (politician), member of the Montana House of Representatives
Katy Sullivan, track and field paralympian
Katie Sullivan (curler) in 2012 United States Junior Curling Championships
Katie Kim (Irish musician), Katie Sullivan, Irish musician

See also
Kate Sullivan (disambiguation)
Catherine Sullivan (disambiguation)
Kathleen Sullivan (disambiguation)
Kathy Sullivan (disambiguation)